The Kuwaiti Ministry of Justice is the ministry responsible for judicial, legal, financial, and administrative affairs. It was established by a decree issued by Sheikh Jaber Al-Ahmad Al-Jaber Al-Sabah on 16 February 1978. The current minister is Abdulaziz Majid Al-Majid.

Ministry tasks 
The ministry is responsible for all of the following:

 Adhering to and maintaining the rules of procedure that govern both civil and criminal courts 
 Investigating and prosecuting crime in accordance with the provisions of law; responsibilities extend to both serious crimes and misdemeanor 
 Supervising prisons
 Providing technical expertise to parties and other government departments 
 Enforcing judicial documents and lawsuit declarations 
 Executing sentences and executive bonds, including accepting, depositing, and disbursing the relevant sums, in accordance with the provisions of law.

The Ministry of Justice of Kuwait is also responsible for the following, which must be enacted in accordance with the provisions of law:

 Registration, authentication, and certification of properties
 Maintenance of commercial books
 Protection/guarding of minors and other vulnerable populations
 Tracking inventory of the legacies of unknown persons or persons whose heirs are not known
 Wherever necessary, keeping such legacies transferred from government agencies and handing them over to the beneficiaries in accordance with the rules in force 
 Cooperating with other Arab and Islamic countries and organizations in the legal and judicial fields.

List of ministers 

 Abdallah al-Muffaraj (1978-1981)
 Salman al-Duayi Al Sabah (1982-1985) [referred to as the Minister of Justice, Legal & Administrative Affairs]
 Sa'ud Muhammed al-'Usaymi (1986) [referred to as the Minister of Justice, Legal & Administrative Affairs]
 Dhari Abdallah Uthman (1987-1991) [referred to as the Minister of Justice, Legal & Administrative Affairs]
 Ghazi Ubayd al-Samar (1992) [referred to as the Minister of Justice, Legal & Administrative Affairs]
 Mishari al-Jasim al-Anjari (1993-1996) [referred to as the Minister of Justice, Legal & Administrative Affairs]
 Muhammed Dayfallah al-Sharar (1997-1998) [referred to as the Minister of Justice, Legal & Administrative Affairs]
 Ahmad Khalid Kulayb (1999) [referred to as the Minister of Justice, Legal & Administrative Affairs]
 Saad Jasim Yusif al-Hashil (2000-2001)
 Ahmad Yaqub Baqir (2002-2005)
 Abdullah al Matouq (2006-2007)
 Hussein Nasser Al-Huraiti (2008-2009)
 Rashed Abdul Mohsen al-Hammaad (2009-2010)
 Ahmad Abdulmohsen al-Mulaifi (2011-2014)
 Nayef Al Ajmi (2014)
 Yaqoub Al-Sane (2014-2016)
 Fahad Mohammed Mohsen Al-Afasi(2017-2020)
 Nawaf Al-Yassin(2020-2021)
 Abdullah Youssef Abdurrahman Al-Roumi(2020-2021)
 Jamal Hadhel Al-Jalwai(2021-2022)
 Abdulaziz Majid Al-Majid (2022–present)

See also 

 Justice ministry
 Politics of Kuwait

References 

Justice ministries
Government of Kuwait